Sheryl Ann Johnson (born December 9, 1957 in Palo Alto, California) is a former field hockey player and coach from the United States. She grew up in Cupertino, CA, and attended Monta Vista High School. She was a three-sport athlete at the University of California Berkeley, playing field hockey, basketball and softball.

Olympics
She was a member of the United States national team from 1978–1991 and was a three time Olympian. She was a member of the 1980 Summer Olympics field hockey team, although she did not compete because the U.S. boycotted the games. She competed in the 1984 Summer Olympics in Los Angeles, California where she and the U.S. National Team won the bronze medal.

Pan American Games
In 1979, she competed in the Pan American Games where team USA finished second, winning a silver medal. Four years later, when Seoul hosted the Summer Games, Johnson finished in eighth position with Team USA. She was named U.S. Field Hockey Athlete of the Year in 1986, 1987 & 1989.

World Record
She long held the Guinness Book of World Records record for the most capped international player, competing in 137 international matches.

Awards
Johnson retired from the national team in 1991. She was inducted into the USFHA Hall of Fame in May 1994. She was one of 461 athletes to receive a Congressional Gold Medal in lieu of competing in the 1980 Olympics. She was honored in the spring of 2001 by the C-society when she was recognized as the only woman in the University of California Berkeley history to earn a Varsity letter in three sports.  She coached the Women's field Hockey team at Stanford University 1984–2002, and was an eight-time NorPac coach of the year.

References

External links
 

1957 births
Living people
American female field hockey players
Field hockey players at the 1984 Summer Olympics
Field hockey players at the 1988 Summer Olympics
Olympic bronze medalists for the United States in field hockey
Sportspeople from Palo Alto, California
California Golden Bears women's basketball players
California Golden Bears field hockey players
California Golden Bears softball players
Medalists at the 1984 Summer Olympics
Congressional Gold Medal recipients
20th-century American women